Henry James Lloyd (2 February 1794 – 3 September 1853) was an English amateur cricketer who played first-class cricket from 1815 to 1830.

Lloyd was born at Marylebone, London. Mainly associated with Marylebone Cricket Club (MCC), he made 34 known appearances in first-class matches.  He played for several predominantly amateur teams including the Gentlemen in the Gentlemen v Players series. He died at Brighton, Sussex.

References

External links
 CricketArchive profile

Sources

Further reading
 H S Altham, A History of Cricket, Volume 1 (to 1914), George Allen & Unwin, 1962
 Derek Birley, A Social History of English Cricket, Aurum, 1999
 Rowland Bowen, Cricket: A History of its Growth and Development, Eyre & Spottiswoode, 1970

1794 births
1853 deaths
English cricketers
English cricketers of 1787 to 1825
English cricketers of 1826 to 1863
Gentlemen cricketers
Marylebone Cricket Club cricketers
Epsom cricketers
Non-international England cricketers
Gentlemen of England cricketers
Married v Single cricketers
E. H. Budd's XI cricketers
Marylebone Cricket Club First 9 with 3 Others cricketers
Marylebone Cricket Club First 8 with 3 Others cricketers